The Durango salamander or pine woods salamander (Ambystoma silvense) is a mole salamander. It is endemic to Mexico where it is found in the Durango and Chihuahua states. Its habitats include ponds, shallow lakes, and pine-oak forests.

References

Mole salamanders
Endemic amphibians of Mexico
Fauna of the Sierra Madre Occidental
Amphibians described in 2004
Taxa named by Robert G. Webb